Owen Gray, also known as Owen Grey (born 5 July 1939), is a Jamaican musician. His work spans the R&B, ska, rocksteady, and reggae eras of Jamaican music, and he has been credited as Jamaica's first home-grown singing star.

Biography
Gray was born in Jamaica. He won his first talent contest at the age of nine, and by the age of twelve he was already appearing in public, playing drums, guitar, and keyboards. He attended the Alpha Boys School and turned professional aged 19. Gray was a dynamic performer on stage, who could be gritty or suave as the song dictated. He was the first singer (of many) to praise a sound system on record, with his "On the Beach" celebrating Clement Dodd's Sir Coxsone Downbeat system in 1959, one of the first releases on Dodd's Studio One label. He was one of the first artists to be produced by Chris Blackwell, in 1960, and his "Patricia" single was the first record ever released by Island Records. 

Gray's first single, "Please Let Me Go", reached the top of the charts in Jamaica, and featured a guitar solo from Australian musician Dennis Sindrey who was a member of The Caribs, a studio band that played on many early Owen Gray recordings.  The single also sold well in the United Kingdom, as did subsequent releases, prompting Gray to emigrate there in 1962. He toured Europe in 1964, and by 1966 he was well known as a soul singer as well as for his ska songs. During 1966, he worked in the UK and Europe with The Krew, then in 1967 with Tony Knights Chessmen. 

In the rocksteady era, he recorded for producer Sir Clancy Collins AKA sir collins . His popularity continued throughout the 1960s, working with producers such as Clement Dodd, Prince Buster, Sydney Crooks, Arthur "Duke" Reid, Leslie Kong, and Clancy Eccles, including work as a duo with Millie Small, with songs ranging from ska to ballads. He continued to record regularly, having a big hit in 1968 with "Cupid". His 1970 track "Apollo 12" found favour with the early skinheads, and in 1972 he returned to Island Records, recording reggae versions of The Rolling Stones' "Tumblin' Dice" and John Lennon's "Jealous Guy", although they met with little success. During this period, he regularly had releases on Pama and Pioneer Internacional label, Camel Records, and one single on Hot Lead Records. He had greater success in Jamaica, however, with "Hail the Man", a tribute to Emperor Haile Selassie, which was popular with the increasing Rastafari following. 

Gray spent a short time living in New Orleans before returning to Jamaica where he turned his hand to roots reggae, working with producer Bunny Lee, and achieving considerable success. In the 1980s relocated to Miami. He has continued to release new material regularly, often concentrating on ballads and Gospel music.

Discography

Albums
Owen Gray Hit After Hit After Hit- Sydney Crooks (Pioneer Internacional)
Owen Gray Sings (1961) Starlite (also Island Records in Jamaica)
Cupid (1969)
Forward on the Scene (1975) Third World
Fire and Bullets (1977) Trojan
Turning Point (1977) Venture
Dreams of Owen Gray (1978) Trojan
Battle of the Giants Round 1 (1983) Vista Sounds (with Pluggy Satchmo)
Oldies But Goodies (1983) Vista Sounds (split with Delroy Wilson)
Max Romeo Meets Owen Gray at King Tubby's Studio (1984) Culture Press (with Max Romeo)
Little Girl (1984) Vista Sounds
Owen Gray Sings Bob Marley (1984) Sarge
This is Owen Gray, Pama
Room at the Top (1986) World Enterprise
Let's Make a Deal World Enterprise
Watch This Sound (1986) Sky Note
Stand By Me (1986) Hitbound
Prince Buster Memory Lane (1986) Phill Pratt
Instant Rapport (1989) Bushranger
Ready Willing and Able (1989) Park Heights
None of Jah-Jah's Children Shall Ever Suffer (198?) Imperial
Living Image (1996) Genesis Gospel Singers
Out in the Open (1997) VP
The Gospel Truth vol 1 Bushranger
Something Good Going On Bushranger
Gospel Truth, vol. 2 (1997) Jet Star
Derrick Morgan and Owen Gray (1998) Rhino (with Derrick Morgan)
True Vibration (1998) Jet Star
Do You Still Love Me (1998) First Edition
The Gospel Truth vol. 3 (1999) Bushranger
On Drive (2000) Jet Star
Better Days (2002) Worldsound
Let's Start All Over (2003) Jet Star
Jesus Loves Me (2004) True Gospel
Baby It's You (2005) Worldsound
Mumbo Jumbo (2005) Revenge
Miss Wire Waist -Pioneer Internacional (Sydney Crooks)
Excellence (????), Bushranger
Jamaica's First Homegrown Star (2020)
Owen Gray - Little Girl + Hit After Hit After Hit (2020)
Owen Gray - Singles 1969 - 1972  (2020)

Compilation albums
Hit After Hit After Hit (1998) First Edition Pioneer Internacional
Hit After Hit After Hit Vol 2 Pioneer Internacional
Hit After Hit After Hit Vol 3 Pioneer Internacional
Hit After Hit After Hit Vol 4 (198?) Pioneer Internacional
Sly & Robbie Presents Owen Gray on Top (1994) Rhino
Memory Lane Vol. 1 (2000)  Sydney Crooks (Pioneer Internacional)
Shook, Shimmy And Shake: The Anthology (2004) Trojan

References

External links
Peter I (2004) "A Question of Recognition – Interview with Owen Gray", Reggae Vibes
Owen Gray at Roots Archives

1939 births
Living people
Musicians from Kingston, Jamaica
Jamaican reggae musicians
Island Records artists
Trojan Records artists